Daniela Fonseca (born 24 July 2002) is a Cuban table tennis player.

Career 
She represented Cuba at the 2019 Pan American Games which was also her debut appearance at the Pan American Games. She represented Cuba at the 2020 Summer Olympics which also marked her debut appearance at the Olympics. She competed in women's singles events and also teamed up with Jorge Campos to compete in the mixed doubles event.

References 

2002 births
Living people
Cuban female table tennis players
Pan American Games competitors for Cuba
Table tennis players at the 2019 Pan American Games
Table tennis players at the 2020 Summer Olympics
Olympic table tennis players of Cuba
21st-century Cuban women